16th NSFC Awards
January 5, 1982

Best Film: 
 Atlantic City 
The 16th National Society of Film Critics Awards, given on 5 January 1982, honored the best filmmaking of 1981.

Winners

Best Picture 
1. Atlantic City
2. Reds
3. Prince of the City
4. Pixote (Pixote: a Lei do Mais Fraco)
5. Pennies from Heaven

Best Director 
1. Louis Malle – Atlantic City
2. Sidney Lumet – Prince of the City
3. Héctor Babenco – Pixote (Pixote: a Lei do Mais Fraco)

Best Actor 
1. Burt Lancaster – Atlantic City
2. Gene Hackman – All Night Long
3. Henry Fonda – On Golden Pond

Best Actress 
1. Marília Pêra – Pixote (Pixote: a Lei do Mais Fraco)
2. Faye Dunaway – Mommie Dearest
3. Diane Keaton – Reds

Best Supporting Actor 
1. Robert Preston – S.O.B.
2. Jerry Orbach – Prince of the City
3. Jack Nicholson – Reds

Best Supporting Actress 
1. Maureen Stapleton – Reds
2. Mona Washbourne – Stevie
3. Lisa Eichhorn – Cutter's Way

Best Screenplay 
1. John Guare – Atlantic City
2. Warren Beatty and Trevor Griffiths – Reds
3. Dennis Potter – Pennies from Heaven
3. Jay Presson Allen and Sidney Lumet – Prince of the City

Best Cinematography 
1. Gordon Willis – Pennies from Heaven
2. Vilmos Zsigmond – Blow Out
3. Vittorio Storaro – Reds

References

External links
Past Awards

1981
National Society of Film Critics Awards
National Society of Film Critics Awards
National Society of Film Critics Awards